Dexter Wright Draper (May 23, 1881 – August 22, 1961) was an American football player and coach, as well as a pediatrician. He was an All-American tackle at the University of Pennsylvania from 1905 to 1907. Draper became head football coach at the University of Texas immediately following the resignation of W. E. Metzenthin in 1909. After compiling a 4–3–1 record, including two losses to Longhorns rival Texas A&M, Draper resigned. He later coached at Franklin & Marshall College and The College of William & Mary before entering his chosen field as a pediatrician. Draper also was the head coach for the William & Mary Tribe men's basketball team from 1913 to 1916. He led the Tribe to a 15–18 record during his two-year tenure. Draper's stint as the football coach from 1913 to 1915 produced a 1–21–2 record.

On August 22, 1961, Draper died aged 80 at a hospital in Lancaster, Pennsylvania after a short illness.

Head coaching record

Football

Basketball

References

External links
 

1881 births
1961 deaths
American football tackles
American men's basketball coaches
Basketball coaches from Massachusetts
Franklin & Marshall Diplomats football coaches
Franklin & Marshall Diplomats men's basketball coaches
Penn Quakers football players
Springfield Pride football players
Swarthmore Garnet Tide football players
Texas Longhorns football coaches
William & Mary Tribe athletic directors
William & Mary Tribe baseball coaches
William & Mary Tribe men's basketball coaches
William & Mary Tribe football coaches
All-American college football players
Sportspeople from Boston
Players of American football from Boston